Third culture may refer to:
 Third Culture Kid, a term for children who have lived a significant portion of their lives in a country other than their native country
 The Third Culture, a 1995 book by John Brockman